Philip Carr may refer to:

 Philip Carr (linguist) (1953–2020), British linguist
 Philip J. Carr (born 1966), American anthropologist
 Phillip Carr (born 1995), American basketball player